The Old Hickman Historic District, in Hickman, Kentucky, is a  historic district which was listed on the National Register of Historic Places in 1990.  The listing included 45 contributing buildings, a contributing structure, and two contributing sites.

It is the original section of the town, along the Mississippi River, below rise to bluffs on the south.  It includes the commercial section along Clinton Street and older residential sections as well.  The commercial buildings are mostly two-part brick buildings; many have original storefront details.

One of the more significant buildings is the Laclede Hotel, a three-story hotel built c. 1898 with a keyhole arched entrance.

It includes Italianate and Colonial Revival architecture.

References

National Register of Historic Places in Fulton County, Kentucky
Historic districts on the National Register of Historic Places in Kentucky
Italianate architecture in Kentucky
Colonial Revival architecture in Kentucky
Buildings and structures completed in 1914